Christine Belford (born Christine Riley) is an American television and film actress. She has sometimes been credited as Christina Belford.

Early life
Christine Riley was born in Amityville, Long Island, New York to Joseph J. Riley and Mary Belford Riley (née Wilson; later Malone),  who later divorced. She has a brother, Terry, and a sister, Shawn. The family once lived at 112 Ocean Avenue, the location which later became famous as the setting of The Amityville Horror, for about five years from age 11 until age 16. As a young child and teenager on Long Island, she was active in equestrian trials and won many horsemanship awards.  "She was enrolled at the best schools and joined the best swimming and yachting clubs on Long Island."  After graduating from high school in 1966, she attended Hofstra University, initially interested in pursuing a career in psychiatry. However, the classwork she did with Joseph Leon, the head of the drama department, inspired her to become an actress.

In 1970, after college she moved to New York City and did some modeling work but no acting. Additionally, she said, "In order to keep a roof over my head and to eat, I took any job I could get. I was a waitress, a bar maid, and I also drove an ice truck." For both personal and professional reasons, she moved to Los Angeles near the end of 1970. There, at the suggestion of a friend, actress Carrie Snodgress, she auditioned at Universal Pictures, performing a scene from the film The Country Girl for the head of talent, Monique James.  Christine then received a seven-year acting contract from Universal Pictures, "A very precious commodity issued only to a chosen few."

Television career
Her first appearance on television was as an extra on the Vince Edwards series Matt Lincoln. Her first credited appearance on television was in the NBC television movie Vanished in 1971. She played insurance investigator Carlie Kirkland during the second season (1973–74) of Banacek. She appeared in the 1980 TV-movie The Gambler with Kenny Rogers and also played Ricky Stratton's mother, Evelyn on Silver Spoons and Jackie on Empire.

She appeared in guest roles on many popular television shows of the 1970s, 1980s, and 1990s, including Ironside, Banacek, Mannix, Barnaby Jones, Owen Marshall, Counselor at Law, The Six Million Dollar Man, CHiPs, Wonder Woman, Magnum, P.I., Hart to Hart, The Incredible Hulk, Family Ties, The Golden Girls, Blossom, Beverly Hills, 90210, Battlestar Galactica (specifically as one of the prison-barge inmates recruited to destroy "The Gun On Ice Planet Zero"), The Paper Chase: The Television Series, My Two Dads, Night Court (specifically the 1992 episode "Opportunity Knock Knocks," where she was credited as Christina Belford), Harry O, Murder, She Wrote, Diagnosis: Murder and  Quincy, Holding Pattern.

She appeared in the episode "Devil Pack" from the 1977 series Quinn Martin's Tales of the Unexpected (known in the United Kingdom as Twist in the Tale), as well as in various television films through the years. Her last appearance on television was in the horse-racing TV movie Ruffian, starring Sam Shepard and broadcast on the ABC network in 2007.

She played on Dynasty as the nurse for Fallon's baby at the end of Season 2 and Season 3. In 1983, she co-hosted, in Los Angeles, with Steve Edwards, Cathy Kronkite, and Ruth Batchelor, an unsuccessful pilot for a daytime-magazine series, Personal & Confidential, over five days (August 1–5, 1983).

Film
 Vanished (1971 TV movie) as Gretchen Greer
 Pocket Money (1972) as Adelita
 The Groundstar Conspiracy (1972) as Nicole Devon
 The Million Dollar Rip-Off (1976 TV movie) as Lil
 To Kill a Cop (1978 TV movie) as Agnes Cusack
 High Midnight (1979 TV movie) as Sgt. Liz Spencer
 Kenny Rogers as The Gambler (1980 TV movie) as Eliza
 Desperate Voyage (1980 TV movie)
 The Neighborhood (1982 TV movie) as Meg Penner
 Sparkling Cyanide (1983 TV movie) as Rosemary Barton
 Christine (1983) as Regina Cunningham
 100 Centre Street (1984 TV movie) as Fran Felt
 Mr. and Mrs. Ryan (1986 TV movie) as Margo Slater
 The Ladies Club (1986) as Dr. Constance Lewis
 The Woman Who Sinned (1991 TV movie) as Randy Emerson
 Ruffian (2007 TV movie) as Barbara Janney

Television

1999 The Wild Thornberrys ...Whale
1994 Diagnosis Murder ...Emily Bissell
1993 Blossom ...Nancy
1993 Step by Step ...Eileen Donovan
1992 Mann & Machine ...Rose
1992 Night Court ...Clare Monroe
1991-1998 Beverly Hills, 90210 ...Samantha Sanders
1991 Who's the Boss? ...Ida Davis
1990 Yes, Virginia ...
1990 Dragnet ...Jean Reynolds
1989 Freddy's Nightmares ...Dr. Weiss
1989 Living Dolls ...Kitty
1989 Empty Nest ...Fran
1989 L.A. Law ...Lily White
1988 Murphy's Law ...Claudia Slocum
1988 My Two Dads ...Myra Young
1987 ABC Afterschool Specials ...Dr. Louise Warner
1986-1987 Outlaws ...Maggie Randall
1986 The Golden Girls ...Kirsten Nylund Adams. 
1986 Family Ties ...Victoria Hurstenberg
1984-1993 Murder, She Wrote ...Missy Stevens / Maude Paulson Winslow / Fiona Keeler 
1984 Breakaway ...Herself
1984 Empire ...Jackie Willow
1984 Goodnight, Beantown ...Allison
1983-1984 Fantasy Island ...Melanie Swan / Marion Robertson
1983 The Love Boat Fall Preview Special  ...Herself
1983 Hart to Hart ...Victoria Dickenson
1983 It's Not Easy 
1982-1987 Silver Spoons ...Evelyn Stratton / Evelyn Stratton Whiting
1982 Dynasty ...Susan Farragut
1982 Cagney & Lacey ...Theresa
1982 Today's F.B.I. 
1981-1983 The Greatest American Hero ...Dotty Parker / Sheila Redman, the Spirit
1981 Nero Wolfe ...Melanie Davidson
1981 Magnum, P.I. ...Adelaide Malone
1980 Beyond Westworld ...Dianna Lionstar
1980 CHiPs ...Denise
1979-1981 The Incredible Hulk ...Leigh Gamble / Linda Calahan
1979 Hart to Hart ...Nikki Stephanos
1979 Dear Detective 
1979 Married: The First Year ...Emily Gorey
1979 The Paper Chase ...Chris Carlyle
1978 The White Shadow ...Dr. Evelyn Crawford
1978 Battlestar Galactica ...Leda
1977 Quincy M.E. ...Sonya
1977 Tales of the Unexpected ...Ann Colby
1977 Most Wanted ...Jennifer Haron
1976 Wonder Woman ...Baroness Paula Von Gunther
1975 Harry O ...Karen Nesbitt
1975 Medical Story ...Hope
1975 Police Story ...Carrie
1975 Kate McShane ...Charlotte Randall Chase
1974-1982 Insight ...Karen / Kate / Kay /
1974 The Manhunter ...Cynthia Browning
1974 Doc Elliot ...Joy Neimeyer
1974 The Six Million Dollar Man ...Lt. Colby
1973-1979 Barnaby Jones ...Virginia Kirkland / Louise Brenner / Eleanor Devers /
1973 Jigsaw ...Gale Parker
1973 Cannon ...Anne Grainger
1972-1974 Banacek ...Carlie Kirkland
1972 Mannix ...Alison Bramante
1972 Alias Smith and Jones ...Ellie Alcott
1972 Cool Million ...Adrienne / Marcella Pascal
1972 The Sixth Sense ...Anna Harris
1971-1972 Owen Marshall, Counselor at Law ...Jeanine Michaels / Karen Slater
1971 Ironside ...Sue Broderick
1971 Matt Lincoln 
1970-1974 Marcus Welby, M.D. ...Sandy / Phyllis Dalton / Lolly

Voiceover career
From the 1990s to the present, Belford has done much voiceover work, including commercials, animations, promotional spots, and narrations.

Personal life
Belford has been married to actor Nicholas Pryor since July 1993.

References

External links 
 

Living people
American television actresses
American film actresses
Actresses from New York (state)
Hofstra University alumni
People from Amityville, New York
Year of birth missing (living people)
21st-century American women